"Levelling up" is a political policy first articulated in the 2019 Conservative Party manifesto that aims to reduce the imbalances, primarily economic, between areas and social groups across the United Kingdom. It seeks to do so without acting to the detriment of prosperous areas, such as much of South East England. A white paper for the policy was published by Boris Johnson's government on 2 February 2022, and has been continued by Rishi Sunak's government. The policy is overseen by the Department for Levelling Up, Housing and Communities, and the incumbent Secretary of State is Michael Gove.

The concept of levelling up has bipartisan support. Labour Party leader Keir Starmer said in October 2022 that a future Labour government would "pick up the challenge of levelling up", but that his party believed only they would be able to deliver it, calling Johnson's plan to deliver levelling up "an empty slogan".

History

Origins
"Levelling-up" was first used in the House of Commons in 1868 in relation to equality between Catholicism and the Church of England, with Serjeant Barry, the Solicitor General for Ireland, saying "If religious equality were attempted in England, it must be either by levelling up or levelling down." Conservative Prime Minister Benjamin Disraeli responded by noting the phrase to be one which "seems to be a very favourite one with Hon. Gentlemen opposite" and said that he should "very much like to have their views as to the distinct meaning they attribute to the phrase".

At a televised hustings event on 24 April 1997, Labour Party Leader Tony Blair, who shortly after became prime minister, stated: ‘I don’t want to level down, I want to level up’, when discussing his preference for low taxes in support of upwardly social mobility.

As a newly elected MP, future Prime Minister Theresa May used the term during an education debate in the House of Commons in 1997. She described socialism as "levelling down" and conservatism as "levelling up".

Former Conservative MP for Putney Justine Greening said in 2021 that she invented the term "levelling up" in 2014, while attempting to explain the concept of social mobility to her mother. In her acceptance speech after securing her seat in the 2015 general election, Greening pledged to focus "on making sure we have a levelled up Britain where everyone can achieve their potential wherever they start, wherever they’re born”. During her tenure as Education Secretary, the phrase "levelling up" appeared increasingly frequently in Department for Education papers, as well as Greening's own speeches and op-eds. However, outside of the Department for Education, the phrase did not receive more widespread use during the Cameron or May premierships.  

Greening claims to have spoken to all candidates in the 2019 Conservative Party leadership election about the importance of levelling up, but that only Johnson appeared to show any enthusiasm for it. 

The first use of "levelling up" as an official Conservative Party policy was in the party's manifesto for the 2019 general election, which stated that a Johnson government "will use this investment prudently and strategically to level up every part of the United Kingdom, while strengthening the ties that bind it together."

Launch

Prime Minister Boris Johnson gave a speech on the policy on 15 July 2021, where he described the various inequalities currently experienced across the United Kingdom. He contrasted "levelling up" with "levelling down" by saying that levelling up would seek to improve everywhere, rather than the zero sum averaging regional policies of the past, stating "we don't think you can make the poor parts of the country richer by making the rich parts poorer". Johnson also included social and quality of life issues such as fighting gang crime, obesity, mental health, uneven life-expectancy and excessive elective surgery waiting times within the wider levelling up agenda.

MP Neil O'Brien was the Prime Minister's levelling up adviser, producing a detailed report in September 2020 setting out the case for levelling up.

The 2020 Treasury spending review announced a £4.8 billion Levelling Up Fund for interim capital investment in local infrastructure. Local authorities were ranked into three tiers by need, and invited to submit project bids by June 2021. The first round focused on transport projects, town centre and high street regeneration, and cultural investment. Two other funds are considered within the interim levelling up agenda: the Community Renewal Fund, which replaces the European Structural and Investment Funds for skills, employment, local businesses, and communities, and the £3.6 billion Towns Fund for 101 towns.

The 2021 Queen's Speech announced that the Government will "level up opportunities across all parts of the United Kingdom, supporting jobs, businesses and economic growth and addressing the impact of the pandemic on public services".

The policy was first trailed to include:
Investment in towns, cities, and rural and coastal areas through use of local growth deals;
Giving those areas more control of how investment is made;
Levelling up skills using apprenticeships and a £3 billion National Skills Fund;
Helping the farming and fishing industries; and
Creating up to 10 freeports to help deprived communities.

Implementation

In September 2021 the Ministry for Housing, Communities and Local Government was renamed the Department for Levelling Up, Housing and Communities under Secretary of State Michael Gove. Neil O'Brien became a Parliamentary Under-Secretary of State for the department. Former Bank of England Chief Economist Andy Haldane was appointed as the head of the Levelling Up Taskforce, operating in the Cabinet Office in conjunction with 15 civil servants from various departments.

In his October 2021 Conservative Party Conference speech, Prime Minister Boris Johnson again emphasised the policy, saying "uniting and levelling up across the UK [is] the greatest project that any government can embark on." Across government, Levelling Up is viewed as a major policy area with funding, and departments framed policies in their remit to the levelling up agenda for the October 2021 United Kingdom budget which incorporated the 2021 Treasury spending review. A Levelling Up white paper was expected by the end of 2021, but was delayed until January 2022.

The successful bids for the first £1.7 billion tranche of the Levelling Up Fund were announced with the budget. The three largest grants were £49.6 million for the south Derby growth zone and infinity garden village, £48 million to help replace vessels and improve harbours Isles of Scilly residents rely on, and £38.7 million for the Advanced Manufacturing Innovation District Scotland travel improvement project in Renfrewshire.
On 30 January 2022, Wolverhampton and Sheffield were chosen as the first places to receive levelling up funding.

In the 2021/2022 financial year only £107 million of levelling up funds were delivered to projects, compared to the original £600 million ambition, later reduced to £200 million in plans.

In summer 2022, the parliamentary Levelling Up, Housing and Communities Committee was asked to comment on the Levelling-up and Regeneration Bill, on which it held three evidence sessions. Its main comment was that the bill provided no funding toward the levelling-up missions of public transport and local connectivity, digital connectivity, improving education outcomes, adult skills training and increasing healthy life expectancy.  It stated there was a lack of detail in the bill. The Committee was concerned that the bill potentially added to centralising planning decisions, rather than supporting localism. It was concerned that affordable housing was not well supported in the 300,000 new homes per year target, and there were no tenure type and location targets.

White paper
The delayed white paper, originally expected in 2021, was published on 2 February 2022. The Department for Levelling Up, Housing and Communities described the white paper as a "moral, social and economic programme for the whole of government. The Levelling Up White Paper sets out how we will spread opportunity more equally across the UK".

There are sections making provisions for affordable housing. Areas with weak education performance will be targeted for extra investment.

Missions 
The White Paper lists 12 missions, aimed to be achieved by 2030:
 Increase pay, employment and productivity
 Domestic public investment in R&D outside south-east to rise by at least 40%.
 London-style public transport connectivity across the UK
 Nationwide broadband
 Fixing the education gap
 Skills training
 Narrowing life expectancy gap, with a UK-wide rise of five years by 2035
 Rise in wellbeing
 Decreased inequalities
 Rise in overall number of first-time homebuyers
 Crime reduction
 Devolution in England

Devolution 
Areas of England that will have the choice of devolution include Cornwall, Derbyshire & Derby; Devon, Plymouth and Torbay; Durham; Hull & East Yorkshire; Leicestershire; Norfolk; Nottinghamshire & Nottingham; and Suffolk.

An "Island Forum" will be established to enable local authorities and Islanders in Orkney, Shetland, the Western Isles, Anglesey and the Isle of Wight to work together on common issues, such as broadband connectivity, and to allow them to communicate directly with the government on the challenges island communities face in terms of levelling up.

The Welsh Government will be consulted on levelling up in Wales.

A £2.6 billion UK Shared Prosperity Fund will be decentralised to local leaders.

Criticism and reception
Following the initial announcement of the policy in 2020, a number of think-tanks, charities and politicians criticised the levelling up funds for being insufficient and centrally managed, rather than being controlled by regions.

In March 2021, the Industrial Strategy Council, a government watchdog chaired by Andy Haldane, who later became the head of the Levelling Up Taskforce, said the plans were "thinly spread", overly focused on infrastructure spending directed by central government, and lacking detail. It also said the scheme's lack of success criteria would make it hard to determine its impact.

The Financial Times reported that the methodology used by the levelling up scheme to determine which areas would receive funds ignored most standard indicators of poverty, and classified 14 areas with higher-than-average wealth levels as "priority one" regions, ahead of more deprived areas. The report noted that all 14 areas had Conservative Party MPs, and its analysis found that Conservative-voting areas were consistently prioritised over poorer Labour-voting areas. A number of critics accused the government of "pork barrel politics".

Levelling Up Fund spending has been criticised for doubts that small local projects could transform the economy or create long-term jobs, and for not giving devolved governments in Scotland, Wales and Northern Ireland a role in selecting projects. An analysis by The Guardian determined that Conservative Party-run local authorities received a higher per capita grant (£93) from the first tranche of the fund than Labour Party-run local authorities (£65 per capita), with no overall control areas receiving £102 per capita and Liberal Democrat areas £183 per capita. A government spokesperson disputed the analysis, saying the criteria for funding was publicly published.

The Institute for Public Policy Research North think tank estimated that levelling funds will lose £560m due to Jeremy Hunt  not inflation-proofing the funds.  The IPPR wrote "With £1 in every £13 of the LUF and SPF now expected to be lost to inflation, cancelling, scaling back or pausing infrastructure investment is inevitable without additional support.  (...)  But reducing the scope of levelling up projects will have implications for the impact they deliver, both in terms of any contribution they may have made to local economic growth and the success of the missions outlined in the levelling up white paper."

The Leader of the Labour Party Sir Keir Starmer said in October 2022 that a future Labour government would "pick up the challenge of levelling up", but that his party believed only they would be able to deliver it, calling Boris Johnson's plan to deliver levelling up "an empty slogan".

Reception of the white paper 
The white paper has been scrutinised by Shadow Secretary of State for Levelling Up, Housing and Communities Lisa Nandy, Metro Mayor of the Liverpool City Region Steve Rotheram, The Times and the Institute for Fiscal Studies. Trades Union Congress general secretary Frances O'Grady said that the white paper "fails to provide a serious plan for decent jobs". Fraser Myers in Spiked wrote that the white paper doesn't "come close to mobilising the resources needed" to level up.

The white paper was also criticised for recycling previous policy announcements. Bristol North West MP Darren Jones, who is Chair of the House of Commons Business, Energy and Industrial Strategy Committee commented that 8 out of the 12 Missions in the White Paper had been "rehashed" from the National Industrial Strategy, with the only new targets being for improving school performance, cutting crime and to “restore local pride”. Journalists at The Independent discovered that parts of the document had been plagiarised from Wikipedia articles on Constantinople and the list of largest cities throughout history.

Other groups were more supportive in their response to the White Paper. Many local authorities, LEP Boards and other local institutions welcomed the White Paper confirming investments in their region. Various groups in the private pensions sector welcomed the White Paper's commitment to direct more money from Local Government Pension Scheme pots to support investment in local areas. The Railway Industry Association, the Social Market Foundation and TechUK welcomed the White Paper's investment commitments in railway infrastructure, skills and R&D, respectively. The Catholic Union of Great Britain welcomed the White Paper's recognition of the role of faith groups in delivering on the Levelling Up agenda.

See also
Assisted areas (United Kingdom)
Brexit
British government response to the COVID-19 pandemic
North–South divide in the United Kingdom
Poverty in the United Kingdom
Regions of England
Regional development
Regional policy of the European Union

References

External links

Boris Johnson
Rishi Sunak
Conservative Party (UK)
Public policy in the United Kingdom
Economic inequality
2019 United Kingdom general election
2020s in British politics
Plagiarism controversies
British political phrases
2019 establishments in the United Kingdom